The resolution of Alevi community disputes or problems in a Dushkunluk Meydani or 'People's Court' presided over by the Alevi dede.

Alevism
Turkish words and phrases